William H. Keith's writing career started in 1978, when he and his brother J. Andrew Keith began writing for Game Designers' Workshop (GDW) for their Traveller universe. He has been prolific science fiction author ever since. He has written under several pseudonyms, most notably as H. Jay Riker  and Ian Douglas.

Dr. Who series

 Dr. Who & the Vortex Crystal (1986)  
 Dr. Who & the Rebel's Gamble (1986)

BattleTech series
 Mercenary's Star (1987) 
 The Price of Glory (1987) 
 Blood of Heroes (with J. Andrew Keith) (1993) 
 Decision at Thunder Rift (1992) 
 Tactics of Duty (1995) 
 Operation Excalibur (1996)

Renegade Legion

 Renegade's Honor (1988)

Freedom's Rangers series

Writing with J. Andrew Keith as Keith William Andrews.
 Freedom's Rangers (1989) 
 Raiders of the Revolution (1989) 
 Search and Destroy (1990) 
 Treason in Time (1990) 
 Sink the Armada! (1990) 
 Snow Kill (1991)

Carrier series

Writing as Keith Douglass.
 Carrier (1991) 
 Viper Strike (1991) 
 Armageddon Mode (1992) 
 Flame-Out (1992) 
 Maelstrom (1993) 
 Countdown (1994) 
 Afterburn (1996) 
(subsequent books in this series written by other authors under the same house name)

Cybernarc series

Writing as Robert Cain.
 Cybernarc (1991) 
 Gold Dragon (1991) 
 Island Kill (1992) 
 Capo's Revenge (1992) 
 Shark Bait (1992) 
 End Game (1993)

Invaders of Charon: Buck Rogers in the XXVth Century series

 Nomads of the Sky (1992)  
 Warlords of Jupiter (1993)  , reprinted as

Sharuq/Stingray

 Sharuq (1993)  
 Stingray (1994)

Warstrider series

 Warstrider (1993) ; reprinted as e-book (2014)
 Rebellion (1993) ; reprinted as e-book (2014)
 Jackers (1994) ; reprinted as e-book (2014)
 Symbionts (1995) ; reprinted as e-book (2014)
 Netlink (1995) ; reprinted as e-book (2014)
 Battlemind (1996) ; reprinted as e-book (2014)

SEALs, the Warrior Breed series

Writing as H. Jay Riker.
 Silver Star (1993) 
 Purple Heart (1994) 
 Bronze Star (1995) 
 Navy Cross (1996) 
 Medal of Honor (1997) 
 Marks of Valor (1998) 
 In Harm's Way (1999) 
 Duty's Call (2000) 
 Casualties of War (2003) 
 Enduring Freedom (2005) 
 Iraqi Freedom (2007)

SEAL Team Seven Series

Writing as Keith Douglass.
 SEAL Team Seven (1994) 
 Specter (1995) 
 Nucflash (1995) 
(subsequent books in this series written by other authors under the same house name)

In the worlds of Keith Laumer

 Bolo Brigade (1997) 
 Bolo Rising (1998) 
 Bolo Strike (2001)  and 
 Retief's Peace (2005)  and

With Babylon 5 celebrities

Written with Peter Jurasik:
 Diplomatic Act (1998)  and 
Ghostwritten for Bruce Boxleitner:
 Frontier Earth (1999)  and 
 Frontier Earth: Searcher (2001)   and

Star*Drive universe

 Two of Minds (1999)

The Silent Service series

Writing as H. Jay Riker.
 Greyback Class (2000) 
 Los Angeles Class (2001) 
 Seawolf Class (2002) 
 Virginia Class (2004) 
 Ohio Class (2006) 
(Greyback Class was written by J. Andrew Keith, not William H. Keith. It is shown here to complete the series.)

Non-fiction
CD-Rom Game Guides, written with Nina Barton:
 Toonstruck (1996) 
 Titanic: Adventure out of Time (1996) 
 Spycraft: the Great Game (1997) 
 Riven Hints & Solutions (1997) 
 Riven Official Solutions (1997) 
 Fallout (1997) 
 Lands of Lore: Guardians of Destiny (1997) 
 Riven Player's Guide (1997) 
 Baldur's Gate (1998) 
Craft:
 The Science of the Craft (2005) ; reprinted as e-book (2014)
Essays:
 "The Fermi Paradox and the Inheritance Universe" (2011) http://www.whkeith.com/fermi.html
 "The Anthropic Principle" (2012) http://www.whkeith.com/anthropic-principle.html

Galactic Marines series

Writing as Ian Douglas.

Heritage Trilogy
 Semper Mars (1998) 
 Luna Marine (1999) 
 Europa Strike (2000) 
Legacy Trilogy
 Star Corps (2003) 
 Battlespace (2006) 
 Star Marines (2007) 
Inheritance Trilogy
 Star Strike (2008) 
 Galactic Corps (2008) 
 Semper Human (2009)

Stephen Coonts' Deep Black series

Written with Stephen Coonts.
 Arctic Gold (2009) 
 Sea of Terror (2010) 
 Death Wave (2011)  and 
(previous books in this series written by Stephen Coonts and Jim DeFelice)

Star Carrier series

Writing as Ian Douglas.
 Earth Strike (2010) 
 Center of Gravity (2011) 
 Singularity (2012) 
 Deep Space (2013) 
 Dark Matter (2014) 
 Deep Time (2015) 
 Dark Mind (April 25, 2017) 
 Bright Light (November 27, 2018) 
 Stargods (December 1, 2020)

Android

 Free Fall (2011)

Star Corpsman series

Writing as Ian Douglas.
 Bloodstar (2012) 
 Abyss Deep (2013)

The Last Line
Written with Lt. Col. Anthony Shaffer
 The Last Line (2013)

Andromedan Dark series

Writing as Ian Douglas.
 Altered Starscape (2016) 
 Darkness Falling (late 2017) ISBN

Short stories

 "Dance of Vengeance" in Shrapnel: Fragments from the Inner Sphere (1989)  
 "Hold Until Relieved" in Bolos IV: Last Stand (1997)  ; reprinted in The Best of the Bolos: Their Finest Hour (2010)  
 "The Scent of Evil" in Starfall (1999)  
 "UNODIR" (writing as H. Jay Riker) in First to Fight (1999) 
 "Fossils" in Asimov's Science Fiction Magazine, August 1999; reprinted in Worldmakers (2001) 
 "A Place to Stand" in Civil War Fantastic (2000)  and 
 "A Show of Force" in Guardsmen of Tomorrow (2000) 
 "Brothers" in Bolos V: Old Guard (2001) 
 "Friendly Fire" (writing as H. Jay Riker) in First to Fight II (2001) 
 "A Terrible Resolve" in A Date Which Will Live in Infamy: An Anthology of Pearl Harbor Stories That Might Have Been (2001)  
 "Iterations" in Past Imperfect (2001)   and 
 "Power Play" in Silicon Dreams (2001)  
 "In the Bubble" in Alternate Gettysburgs (2002)   and  
 "Los Niños" in Future Wars (2003)  
 "Silent Company" in Crash Dive: First to Fight III (2003)  
 "The Weapon" in Future Weapons of War (2007)   and 
 "Partnership" in Man vs. Machine (2007)  
 "Starfire" in Battletech: 25 Years of Art & Fiction (2009)  
 "Americans Landing at Normandy Beach" in Men at War (2009)  
 "Dead Names" in Shadowrun: Spells & Chrome (2011)
 "The Johnson Maneuver" in Armored (2012)
 "Riding the Wind" in Shanghai Steam (2012)
 "Positive Message" in Fiction River 2: How to Save the World (2013)
 "The New Angeles Space Elevator" (uncredited) in The Worlds of Android: Visions of Life in the Future (2016)
 "Rings of Earth" in Towering Yarns: Space Elevator Short Stories (Volume 1) (2017)

References

Bibliographies by writer
Bibliographies of American writers
Science fiction bibliographies